The following is a timeline of the history of the city of Nice, France.

Prior to 19th century

 262 CE - Nice taken by Goth forces.
 859 - Nice sacked by Saracens.
 880 - Nice sacked by Saracens again.
 1388 -  effected.
 1538 -  signed in Nice.
 1543 - Siege of Nice by Turkish forces.
 1545 -  (bridge) rebuilt.
 1561 - Italian replaces Latin as official language of Nice.
 1564 - Major earthquake.
 1650/85 - Nice Cathedral constructed.
 1706 - Castle of Nice demolished by Duke of Berwick by command of Louis XIV.
 1720
 Nice becomes part of the Kingdom of Sardinia.
 Medical school established.
 1724 -  church built.
 1770 - Quai des Ponchettes built.
 1772 -  newspaper begins publication.
 1780 -  paved.
 1783 - Cimetière du Château (cemetery) established.
 1784 -  built.
 1790 - Public library founded.
 1792 - Conquered by French Revolutionary troops in September, annexed in November.
 1793
 Nice becomes part of the Alpes-Maritimes department of France.
 Population: 24,117.
 1800 - May: Nice occupied briefly by Austrian forces.(fr)

19th century
 1812 -  (school) opens.
 1814 - Nice is returned to and thus becomes part of the Kingdom of Sardinia per Congress of Vienna.
 1822 - Promenade des Anglais construction begins.
 1832 - 25 April: Religious  taken in response to cholera epidemic.
 1846 - Muséum d'histoire naturelle de Nice founded.
 1852
  (church) built.
 English circulating library active.
 1854 -  (park) opens.
 1855 - Maritime trade flourishes.
 1856 - Population: 44,091.
 1860 - .
 1861 - Francization begins.
 1863 - Phare du Littoral newspaper begins publication.
 1864
 Avenue Jean Médecin laid out.
 Nice-Ville station opened.
 1867 - Russian Orthodox Cemetery, Nice, established.
 1870 - Swiss and Nice Times newspaper begins publication.
 1879
 Horsecar tramway begins operating.
  newspaper begins publication.
 1881 - 23 March: Opéra de Nice burns down.
 1882
  built.
  (bridge) demolished.
 1883 - L'Éclaireur newspaper begins publication.
 1884 -  built.
 1885 - Opéra de Nice rebuilt.
 1886 -  built.
 1887 - Nice Observatory inaugurated.
 1890 - Nice Lawn Tennis Club established.
 1891
 Population: 88,273.
 1892
 Gare du Sud built.
 Grasse-Nice Chemins de Fer de Provence (railway) begins operating.
 1896 -  erected in the Jardin Albert 1er.
 1900 - Electric tramway begins operating.

20th century

1901-1944
 1901 - Population: 105,109.
 1903 - A la mieu bella Nissa popular song written.
 1904
 Gymnaste Club de Nice formed.
 Promenade des Anglais extended to the river Var.
 1911 - Population: 142,940.
 1912 - Russian Orthodox Cathedral opens, funded by Tsar Nicholas II of Russia.
 1913 - Hotel Negresco in business.
 1916 - Conservatory of Nice founded.
 1919
 Canton of Nice-1, 2, 3, and 4 created.
 Victorine Studios of film established.
 1927 - Stade du Ray (stadium) opens.
 1928 - Palais des Arts opens.
 1929 - Palais de la Méditerranée casino opens.
 1931 - Population: 219,549.
 1933 -  (church) built.
 1942 - 11 November: Italian occupation begins.
 1943 - 8 September: Italian occupation ends.
 1944
 26 May: Bombing by Allied forces.(fr)
 28 August: .

1945-1990s
 1945 - Nice-matin newspaper begins publication.
 1948 - Nice Jazz Festival begins.
 1954
 Centre International de Formation Européenne headquartered in Nice.
 Population: 244,360.
 1955 - Canton of Nice-5 and 6 created.
 1956 - Fountain installed in the Place Masséna.
 1963 - Musée Matisse opens.
 1968 - Population: 322,442.
 1970 - Palais Lascaris (musical instrument museum) opened.
 1973
  established.
 Canton of Nice-7, 8, 9, and  created.
 1979 - 16 October: Weather-related 1979 Nice events occur.
 1981 - June: 1981 Tour de France cycling race departs from Nice.(fr)
 1982
 Nice becomes part of the Provence-Alpes-Côte d'Azur region.
 1984 - Palais des Congrès Acropolis built.
 1988 -  newspaper begins publication.
 1991 - Gare de Nice CP opens.
 1995 - Jacques Peyrat becomes mayor.
 1999
  established.
 Population: 342,738.

21st century

2000s
 2001 - 26 February: European Treaty of Nice signed in city.
 2002 - Urban community of Nice Côte d'Azur created.
 2003 - Bombing.
 2007 - Nice tramway opens.
 2008 - Christian Estrosi becomes mayor.

2010s
 2011
 Metropolis Nice Côte d'Azur created.
 Population: 344,064.
 2013
 Allianz Riviera stadium opens.
 2013 Jeux de la Francophonie held in Nice.
 2014 - March:  held.
 2015
 February: Stabbing.
 October:  occurs.
  December: 2015 Provence-Alpes-Côte d'Azur regional election held.
 2016 - July: Terrorist attack kills 86 and injures 434.

2020s
 2020 - October: Terrorist attack kills three, with one victim being beheaded.

See also
 Nice history
 
 
 
 Other names of Nice
 
  department
  region

Other cities in the Provence-Alpes-Côte d'Azur region:
 Timeline of Aix-en-Provence
 
 Timeline of Avignon
 Timeline of Marseille
 Timeline of Toulon

References

This article incorporates information from the French Wikipedia.

Bibliography

in English
 
 

 

 
 
  circa 1907

in French

External links

 Items related to Nice, various dates (via Europeana).
 Items related to Nice, various dates (via Digital Public Library of America).

nice